Maria Makarena Owen (born 22 July 1962), known professionally as Rena Owen, is a New Zealand actress in theatre, television and film. Owen is best known for her leading role as Beth Heke in Lee Tamahori's Once Were Warriors and as Taun We in George Lucas's Star Wars: Episode II – Attack of the Clones.

Early life
Born in the New Zealand Bay of Islands, Owen is of Welsh, English, Irish, and Māori descent. One of nine children, she grew up in Moerewa, raised Catholic in a small rural town in the North Island's Bay of Islands. She regularly performed in local Maori culture groups and performed in dramas and musicals while in high school. Owen pursued a medical career and trained as a nurse at Auckland Hospital for three and a half years. Once she qualified as a registered nurse, Owen moved to London, England.

Career
Owen trained at the Actors Institute in London in the mid-1980s and worked extensively in British theatre. Highlights include Voices From Prison for the Royal Shakespeare Company, Co-Existences for the Elephant Theatre and Outside in for Theater New Zealand, which debuted at the Edinburgh Festival. Owen wrote and starred in Te Awa i Tahuti (The River That Ran Away), which had a successful London tour and was later published by NZ Playmarket in 1991.

On her return to New Zealand in 1989, Owen acted in two dramas for Television NZ's E Tipu E Rea series. A first of its kind, the series was written, acted, directed, and produced by Māori, telling Māori stories. She worked extensively in theatre; acting, writing, directing, working as a dramaturge, and was a founding member of Taki Rua Theatre. Owen wrote and starred in Daddy's Girl, while also playing reoccurring roles in two TV series; Betty's Bunch & Shark in the Park. Recent theatre credits include starring in the classic NZ plays, Haruru Mai for the NZ International Arts Festival and The Pohutukawa Tree for ATC. In the USA, she has acted in multiple stage readings for Native Voices at the Autry in LA, and a charity stage reading of Vagina Monologues for the City of West Hollywood. She also played the lead in a Hawaiian play called Fine Dancing, adapted and directed Toa Fraser's play Bare for the Asian American Theatre Company in San Francisco (AATC).

In Once Were Warriors, Owen played the leading role of Beth Heke alongside Temuera Morrison, who played her husband. Once Were Warriors is predominantly narrated from Beth's perspective, and her performance was praised as "classic". Owen reprised the role in the film's sequel, What Becomes of the Broken Hearted? (1999).

Owen played Taun We in George Lucas' Star Wars: Episode II – Attack of the Clones, Nee Alavar in Star Wars: Episode III – Revenge of the Sith, and a cameo role in Steven Spielberg's A.I. Whilst playing a reoccurring role in WB's Angel, Owen played supporting and cameo roles in multiple international independent films. Highlights include the NZ Canadian co-production, Nemesis Game, Garth Maxwell's When Love Comes, Rolf de Heer's acclaimed Dance Me to My Song, Vincent Ward's acclaimed Rain of the Children, and US thrillers Alyce Kills & The Well. She played leading roles in the Australian TV drama series Medivac in 1998 and recently in ABC's The Straits, a multi-ethnic crime-family drama. She also appeared in A&E's Longmire.

In 2011, as part of the 2011 Rugby World Cup, Owen took park in a televised concert called Mika's Aroha Mardi Gras. Owen playing the part of the story teller of at the event, host 15,000 people in an outdoor event in two concerts on one evening.

Recently Owen and Morrison completed work on a documentary celebrating the 20-year anniversary of Once Were Warriors.

In 2016, Rena was cast in the Freeform thriller series' Siren as Helen, which was premiered on March 29, 2018.

Star Wars
Owen acted as Taun We in Star Wars: Episode II – Attack of the Clones (2002) (in which Temuera Morrison played Jango Fett) and acted in Star Wars: Episode III – Revenge of the Sith (2005) as Nee Alavar. She also worked with the Star Wars Expanded Universe when she reprised her role as Taun We in the video game Star Wars: Republic Commando and also an uncredited role as Jedi Master Tionne Solusar in the video game Star Wars Battlefront: Renegade Squadron. In 2021, Owen reprised her role as Taun We in Star Wars: The Bad Batch.

Awards
Her role in Once Were Warriors earned Owen rave reviews and multiple international awards including Best Actress at the Montreal World Film Festival, Oporto Film Festival, San Diego International Film Festival, and the Cannes Film Festival Spirit Award. In New Zealand, she was awarded a Special Benny Award for Excellence in Film, and the Toastmasters Communicator of the Year Award.

Further acting accolades include a Best Supporting Actress nomination for her role in the 1997 New Zealand TV Series, Coverstory and an AFI Best Supporting Actress nomination in 1998 for her role in Rolf de Heer's film, Dance Me to My Song. She won the Best Supporting Actress Award at the 2012 Aotearoa Film and Television Awards (AFTA) for her role as Hine Ryan in the New Zealand soap opera Shortland Street. She was nominated for Best Supporting Actress for her recurring role as Mere Hahunga in the award-winning Australian TV series, East West 101, at the Australian Academy of Cinema and Television Arts, and nominated for Best Actress at the Montecarlo International Television Festival.

 Australian Academy of Cinema and Television Arts Award Nomination (2012): Best Guest or Supporting Actress in a Television Drama- East West 101
 New Zealand Film and TV Awards Winner (2011): Best Supporting Actress- Shortland Street
 Film Critics Circle of Australia Awards Nomination (1999): Best Supporting Actress- Dance Me to My Song
 Australian Film Institute Awards Nomination (1998): Best Performance by an Actress in a Supporting Role- Dance Me to My Song
 NZ Film & TV Awards Nomination (1997): Best Supporting Actress- Cover Story
 Chicago Film Critics Association Award for Best Actress (1994):  Once Were Warriors
 Montreal World Film Festival Winner (1994): Best Actress- Once Were Warriors
 San Diego International Film Festival (1994): Best Actress- Once Were Warriors
 New Zealand Maori Queen, Dame Te Atairangikaahu Literary Award, 1992

Filmography

Film

Television

Video games

Theatre
 Lead Role: Pohutukawa Tree, Auckland Theatre Company, New Zealand (2009)

References

External links
 Official site
 
 ScreenTalk Interview with Rena Owen – December 2008. Requires Flash video software (60.4 MB).
 Rena's NZ On Screen profile

1962 births
Living people
New Zealand Māori actresses
New Zealand film actresses
New Zealand television actresses
New Zealand soap opera actresses
New Zealand nurses
New Zealand women nurses
New Zealand people of Welsh descent
New Zealand emigrants to the United Kingdom
20th-century New Zealand actresses
21st-century New Zealand actresses
Ngāti Hine people
Ngāpuhi people